Genise Montecillo (born January 6, 1963) is an American politician who served in the Missouri House of Representatives from 2011 to 2017.

References

1963 births
Living people
Democratic Party members of the Missouri House of Representatives
Women state legislators in Missouri